Jason Young (born May 27, 1981) is an American discus thrower who competed in the 2012 Summer Olympics, finishing 19th.  At Texas Tech, Young was a  two-time All-American in track and field and placed second in the discus at the 2004 NCAA Outdoor Championship.  In 2010 and 2011, he was the runner-up in discus at the USA Outdoor Track and Field Championships.  He finished 2010 as the number two ranked discus thrower in the world, and has been ranked among the top ten in the United States six times.

Early life
Jason Young was born May 27, 1981. He first started throwing the discus in high school and was quickly hooked; by age 17, he knew he wanted to compete the event at the Olympics. He graduated from Samuell High School in Dallas, Texas in 1999.

Athletic career
After high school, Young attended Texas Tech University where he was a two-time All-American in track and field. In 2003, he placed fourth in the discus at the NCAA Outdoor Championships. By the time he graduated in 2004, Young had set three school records – the indoor weight throw, the outdoor discus, and the hammer throw. As of 2012, all three records still stand. He also qualified for the Olympic Trials where he placed ninth in the discus.

In 2006, Young finished the year ranked number two in the country at the discus and number six in the world. He took 2007 off, and finished 2008 ranked number two and number 15. As of 2012, Young has now been ranked in the top 10 nationally at the discus six times.

At the 2008 Olympic Trials, Young placed 9th in the discus. In 2011, he lost his job and "almost quit" competing.

At the 2012 Olympic Trials, Young threw the discus  in the first round to take an early lead. He placed third and made the 2012 United States Olympic Team. As it turned out, his first round throw would have also been good enough for the third and final qualifying spot. "It’s been a really long road to try to get here," he remarked. "More than anything else, I’m relieved that I’m finally on the team."

His next two attempts were fouls while several other competitors improved their marks. As a result, Young fell to 18th place and did not advance out of the qualifying round. He did, however, finish ahead of the other two American competitors.

Young is self-coached and is sponsored by Nike.

Personal life
After college, Young worked as a strength and conditioning coach for Texas Tech.  He currently lives in Lubbock, Texas where he works as a personal trainer.  He is married to former Texas Tech teammate Megan Young, and has a one-year-old son, Omo.  In order to raise money to get his family to London for the 2012 Olympics, Young conducted several fundraising events.  Being a track and field competitor is "extremely difficult," he explained. "Very few people can make a full-time living at track and field".

References

External links
 
 

1981 births
Living people
American male discus throwers
Athletes (track and field) at the 2012 Summer Olympics
Olympic track and field athletes of the United States
Texas Tech Red Raiders men's track and field athletes